HNoMS Utsira (S301) may refer to one of the following submarines of the Royal Norwegian Navy:

 , a  launched in 1965 and scrapped in 1998
 , an  launched in 1991 and in active service

Royal Norwegian Navy ship names